Eurasia Drilling Company Limited is a Publicly Traded retail company in Russia. Eurasia Drilling Company is Offshore & Onshore oil drilling services company.

History 
In December 2004, Eurasia Drilling was formed after acquisition of onshore drilling business of LUKOIL. In 2006, Eurasia Drilling entered into offshore drilling business as well acquiring the offshore drilling business of LUKOIL.

The company is listed in the London Stock Exchange.

Notable people 
 

Alexander Putilov

References 

Service companies of Russia
Drilling rig operators
Companies based in Moscow